The CAC Sabre, sometimes known as the Avon Sabre or CA-27, is an Australian variant of the North American Aviation F-86F Sabre fighter aircraft. The F-86F was redesigned and built by the Commonwealth Aircraft Corporation (CAC). Equipping five RAAF squadrons, the type saw action in the Malayan Emergency in the late 1950s, and was employed for air defence in Malaysia and Thailand in the 1960s. Ex-RAAF models also saw service with the Royal Malaysian Air Force and the Indonesian Air Force.

Development
In 1951, CAC obtained a licence agreement to build the F-86F Sabre. In a major departure from the North American blueprint, it was decided that the CA-27 would be powered by a licence-built version of the Rolls-Royce Avon R.A.7, rather than the General Electric J47. In theory, the Avon was capable of more than double the maximum thrust and double the thrust-to-weight ratio of the US engine. This necessitated a re-design of the fuselage, as the Avon was shorter, wider and lighter than the J47. Because of the engine change the type is sometimes referred to as the Avon Sabre. To accommodate the Avon, over 60 percent of the fuselage was altered and there was a 25 percent increase in the size of the air intake. Another major revision was in replacing the F-86F's six machine guns with two 30mm ADEN cannon, while other changes were also made to the cockpit and to provide an increased fuel capacity.

The prototype aircraft (designated CA-26 Sabre) first flew on 3 August 1953. The production aircraft were designated the CA-27 Sabre and first deliveries to the Royal Australian Air Force began in 1954. The first batch of aircraft were powered by the Avon 20 engine and were designated the Sabre Mk 30. Between 1957 and 1958 this batch had the wing slats removed and were redesignated Sabre Mk 31. These Sabres were supplemented by 20 new-build aircraft. The last batch of aircraft were designated Sabre Mk 32 and used the Avon 26 engine, of which 69 were built up to 1961.

Operational history

The RAAF operated the CA-27 from 1954 to 1971. The Aircraft Research and Development Unit (ARDU) received the first example in August 1954; re-delivered to No. 2 (Fighter) Operational Training Unit (2 OTU) in November. Over the next six years the Sabres progressively equipped No. 75 Squadron RAAF (75 Sqn), No. 3 Squadron RAAF (3 Sqn), No. 77 Squadron RAAF (77 Sqn) and No. 76 Squadron RAAF (76Sqn).

From 1958 to 1960, CAC Sabres of No. 78 Wing RAAF (78 Wing), comprising 3 Sqn and 77 Sqn, undertook several ground attack sorties against communist insurgents in the Federation of Malaya, during the Malayan Emergency. Following the Emergency, they remained in Malaysia at RMAF Butterworth (RAAF Butterworth).  Armed with Sidewinder missiles, the Sabres were responsible for regional air defence during the Konfrontasi between Indonesia and Malaysia from 1963 until 1966, though no combat took place. Between October and December 1965, a detachment of six Sabres, initially from 77 Sqn and later from 3 Sqn, was based at Labuan to conduct combat patrols over the Indonesian–Malaysian border on Borneo.

In 1962, a detachment of eight CAC Sabres, which was later expanded and designated No. 79 Squadron RAAF (79 Sqn), was sent from RMAF Butterworth to Ubon Royal Thai Air Force Base (RAAF Ubon), Thailand, to assist the Thai and Laotian governments in actions against communist insurgents. Australia and Thailand were allies of South Vietnam and the United States during the Vietnam War; 79 Sqn was responsible for local air defence at Ubon, where United States Air Force attack and bomber aircraft were based. The squadron never engaged North Vietnamese aircraft or ground forces. Two Sabres were lost to engine failure in Thailand, in September 1964 and January 1968. 79 Sqn ceased operations and was deactivated in July 1968.

The RAAF began re-equipping with the Dassault Mirage III in 1964. The last Sabres in Australian service, operated by No. 5 Operational Training Unit RAAF (5 OTU), were retired in July 1971.

Former RAAF CAC Sabres were operated by 11 Squadron Royal Malaysian Air Force (11 Sqn RMAF) between 1969 and 1972. Following the establishment of better relations with Indonesia, 23 CAC Sabres were donated to the Indonesian Air Force (TNI-AU) between 1973 and 1975, and operated by No. 14 Squadron TNI-AU; five of these were former Malaysian aircraft.

Variants
CA-26 Sabre
Prototype, one built.
CA-27 Sabre Mk 30
Production version powered by the Avon 20 engine and fitted with leading-edge slats; 22 built.
CA-27 Sabre Mk 31
Version similar to Mk 30 but with an extended leading edge; 20 built and surviving Mk 30s converted to this standard.
CA-27 Sabre Mk 32
Final production batch with underwing pylons and Avon 26 engine; 69 built.

Operators

 Royal Australian Air Force
 No. 3 Squadron
 No. 75 Squadron
 No. 76 Squadron
 No. 77 Squadron
 No. 79 Squadron
 No. 2 Operational Conversion Unit
 No. 5 Operational Training Unit

 Indonesian Air Force
 No. 14 Squadron
 
 Royal Malaysian Air Force
 No. 11 Squadron

Preserved aircraft

Airworthy CAC Sabres 
In Australia, there are only two former RAAF-owned Sabres (A94-983 and A94-352) that have been restored to flying condition, A94-983 is at the Temora Aviation Museum, New South Wales – ownership was transferred to the RAAF in July 2019 and it is operated by the Air Force Heritage Squadron (Temora Historic Flight). A94-352 is currently owned privately by Sqn Ldr Jeff Trappett (RAAF retired) and is stored at Latrobe Regional Airport. (A94-907 is also at Latrobe Valley being used as a source of parts in the restoration of A94-352.)

In 1973 A94-352 crashed on takeoff at Ngurah Rai International Airport, Bali, on its delivery flight to the Indonesian Air Force. The engine was removed and returned to CAC for assessment. On 18 February 1974 a submission was made and approval given on 14 March 1975 for free transfer of some spare parts to the Warbirds Aviation Museum.

Specifications (Mk 32)

See also

References

Notes

Bibliography

External links

 Australian National Aviation Museum – CA-27 Sabre A94–989 on display
 "The Avon-Sabre" – 1954 Flight article
 Details of Sabres in Indonesian service
 Details of Sabres in Malaysian service

Sabre
1950s Australian fighter aircraft
Single-engined jet aircraft
Low-wing aircraft
Australia–United States military relations
F-86 Sabre
Aircraft first flown in 1953